The China Tibetology Research Center (Tibetan: ཀྲུང་གོའི་བོད་རིག་པ་ཞིབ་འཇུག་ལྟེ་གནས།; Wylie: Krung go'i bod rig pa zhib 'jug ste gnas) is an academic research organization in Beijing, China devoted to the study of Tibet (Tibetology). It studies all aspects of Tibet including subjects related to everyday life in Tibetan areas (economy, ecology etc.).

Founding

The China Tibetology Research Center was founded in Beijing on May 20, 1986.

Subdivisions

Five research institutes comprise the scholarly core of the Chinese Tibetology Research Center. They are:

 Institute for Social and Economic Studies
 Institute for History Studies
 Institute for Religious Studies
 Institute for Contemporary Tibetan Studies
 Institute for Tibetan Medicine Studies.

Additionally, the Center also manages the China Tibetology Publishing House, the Kanjur and Tanjur Collation Bureau, the Beijing Tibetan Medical Center, the China Tibetology press and the Center’s Library.

Activities

International collaboration and academic exchange are key activities of the Chinese Tibetology Research Center. The Center has successfully held three international seminars for Tibetan studies. In 2001, about 220 scholars from 14 countries attended the Beijing International Seminar for Tibetan Studies. Since the year 2000, the Center has hosted about 230 scholars, diplomats and journalists from 40 countries.

Position on 2008 Tibetan unrest

The regional government of Tibet is quoted: "There has been enough evidence to prove that the recent sabotage in Lhasa was 'organised, premeditated and masterminded' by the Dalai clique," as published by the Xinhua news agency, citing the Tibet government.

Maureen Fan of the Washington Post on March 27, 2008 wrote, 
"Experts from the government-established China Tibetology Research Center echoed leaders in blaming the Dalai Lama for deliberately sparking the protests to separate Tibet from China and sabotage the Aug. 8-24 Beijing Olympics."

She further wrote of Lhagpa Phuntshogs, General Director of the China Tibetology Research Center that, 
"... even though the Lhasa riots were 'carefully premeditated and organized' by the Dalai Lama, he said, 'so long as the Dalai Lama abandons his separatist position, stops all separatist activities and recognizes Tibet and Taiwan as part of China, the door for consultation and dialogue between him and the central government is always open.' Professor Lian Xiangmin, director of the center's Research Projects Office, responded to a question on whether China is afraid of the Dalai Lama by saying, 'I do not think I said the Dalai is highly violent, and I also believe that so long as 1.3 billion Chinese people are united as one, they will fear no one.' "

In 2016 John Powers wrote about 2008's "unprecedented levels of protest" and that "On March 7, 2009, Wang Xiaobin, a scholar at the China Tibetology Research Centre, told foreign reporters: 'We think the Dalai Lama is the reason for the riots in Tibet... and the Dalai Lama is a card, a chip in a wider diplomatic struggle.... If there was no intervention by the West, there would be no Tibet issue at all. The Tibet issue is a creation of the USA.' "

See also
Library of Tibetan Works and Archives
Namgyal Institute of Tibetology
Norbulingka Institute

References

External links
 Official website of the China Tibetology Research Center
 An Account of the Various Editions of Kangyur and the Results of Their Collation
 An Introduction to the English Edition of China's Tibetology

Tibetology